Straight, No Chaser is the sixth studio album by American rapper Reks. The album is produced in its entirety by Statik Selektah. The album was released on April 24, 2012, under ShowOff and Brick. It features other Boston rappers such as Termanology, Kali, Slaine and more.

Track listing 
All songs produced by Statik Selektah

External links 
 , “UGHH, 2012.
 ''. iTunes, 2012	

2012 albums
Reks albums
Statik Selektah albums
Albums produced by Statik Selektah